Lidanus was a Benedictine abbot credited with draining the Pontine Marshes, Italy, and for founding Sezze Abbey in the Papal States. He died at Monte Cassino, in 1118 of natural causes.

Notes

Italian Roman Catholic saints
12th-century Christian saints
1118 deaths
Italian Benedictines
People from the Province of L'Aquila
1026 births